My Great Grandfather is a 2019 Malayalam-language family-drama film starring Jayaram, Surabhi Santosh, Divya Pillai and directed by Aneesh Anwar. The cinematography was handled by Sameer Haq and the film was bankrolled by Achicha Cinemas, which previously produced Kunchacko Boban-starrer Kuttanadan Marpappa.

The switch on ceremony of the film garnered a lot of media attention as it was attended by the superstars of Malayalam cinema Mammootty and Mohanlal.

The film was shot mainly in Alappuzha, Ooty and Cherthala and was released on 7 June 2019.

Loosely based on the 2008 South Korean film Scandal Makers.

Plot 

Michael, a 40-something happy-go-lucky businessman, is in love with Delna, a pretty young girl in her 20s. On the day of their engagement, a young woman named Sharon, also in her 20s, walks in with her son, claiming to be Michael's daughter turning his carefree life upside down.

The rest of the film is about discovering whether the girl is, in fact, Michael's biological daughter. The film explores the meaning and importance of family ties and friendship with a comical undertone.

Cast 

Jayaram as Michael Tharakan
Surabhi Santosh as Sharon
Unni Mukundan as Sam Christy, Sharon's husband(cameo appearance)
Baburaj as Shivadaas, Michael's friend
Divya Pillai as Delna
Asha Aravind as Pooja, Sivan's Sister
Johny Antony as Saddham Hussain
Ramesh Pisharody as Father Gabriel
Dharmajan Bolgatty as 'Kurukkan' Paulson
Vijayaraghavan as Tharakan Kora, Michael's father
Mallika Sukumaran as Mary, Michael's mother
Valsala Menon as Kochumol, Michael's grandmother
 Master Harish as Mikkie
Senthil Krishna as Vijayan
Salim Kumar as Illiyas
Baiju Santhosh as SI Vincent Gomas
 Subhish Sudhi as Baiju
 Sunil Sukhada as Louis
Shivaji Guruvayoor as Chandrappan, Shivan's father
 Sajan Palluruthi as Lassar
Aristo Suresh as Shavaparambil Porinchu
 Alankritha Mathew as Nancy

Reviews 
The Times of India gave the film a 3 on 5, wrote "The first half drags a bit as the director tries to describe the friendship of Michael and Sivan with some consciously introduced scenes. The tale comes alive in the second half along with humorous situational comedy."; "(Aneesh) Anwar wraps it up with a suspense-filled and sentimental climax which offers a message on friendship and its relevance. Overall, My Great Grandfather is a fun ride that conveys the message that for love and friendship age is not a barrier."

References

External links
 

2019 films
2010s Malayalam-language films